PJ Harvey is an English musician and singer-songwriter. She has released nine studio albums—Dry (1992), Rid of Me (1993), To Bring You My Love (1995), Is This Desire? (1998), Stories from the City, Stories from the Sea (2000), Uh Huh Her (2004), White Chalk (2007), Let England Shake (2011), and The Hope Six Demolition Project (2016)—and two collaboration albums with John Parish. In addition, she has released three compilation albums and three video albums. Several of Harvey's singles have appeared on the UK Singles Chart, including "Down by the Water" which peaked at number 38, "A Perfect Day Elise" which peaked at number 25, and "The Letter" which peaked at number 28.

Since the release of Dry, Harvey has received widespread critical acclaim. In 1992, Rolling Stone named her Best New Female Singer and Best Songwriter. Among the accolades she has received are the 2001 and 2011 Mercury Prize for Stories from the City, Stories from the Sea and Let England Shake respectively—the only artist to have been awarded the prize twice—eight BRIT Award nominations, seven Grammy Award nominations, and the Outstanding Contribution To Music at the NME Awards. Two of her albums—Rid of Me and Stories from the City, Stories from the Sea—have been listed on Rolling Stones 500 Greatest Albums of All Time list and her third studio album To Bring You My Love was named album of the year by Hot Press, People, Rolling Stone and The Village Voice.

Harvey's eighth studio album, Let England Shake, was released in 2011 to "universal acclaim." It was nominated for best album at the BRIT Awards, NME Awards, Q Awards and the South Bank Sky Arts Awards. In addition to winning album of the year at the Ivor Novello Awards and the Mercury Prize, Let England Shake was named best album of 2011 by 16 international publications and was featured on 34 other publications' year-end lists. Overall, Harvey has received 6 awards from 29 nominations.

A2IM Libera Awards

|-
| 2012
| Let England Shake
| Independent Album of the Year 
|

Billboard Music Video Awards
The Billboard Music Video Awards, which celebrate achievements of the music video industry, are sponsored by Billboard magazine.

|-
| 1995
| "Down by the Water"
| Best Alternative/Modern Rock Video 
|

Brit Awards
The Brit Awards are the British Phonographic Industry's (BPI) annual pop music awards. Harvey has been nominated eight times

!
|-
| 1994 || rowspan=7|PJ Harvey || rowspan=7|British Female Solo Artist || 
|
|-
| 1996 || 
|
|-
| 1999 || 
|
|-
| 2001 || 
|
|-
| 2002 || 
|
|-
| 2005 || 
|
|-
| 2008 || 
|
|-
| 2012 || Let England Shake || British Album of the Year || 
|

Danish Music Awards
The Danish Music Awards is a Danish award show. The show has been arranged by IFPI since 1989.

|-
| 1999
| PJ Harvey
| Best Foreign Female Artist 
|

European Festival Awards
The European Festivals Awards were established in 2009.  They are voted for by the public via the European Festival Awards website and receive hundreds of thousands of votes annually. 

!Ref.
|-
| 2016
| PJ Harvey
| Best Headliner
| 
|

GAFFA Awards

Denmark GAFFA Awards
Delivered since 1991, the GAFFA Awards are a Danish award that rewards popular music by the magazine of the same name.

!
|-
| 1996
| rowspan=4|Herself
| rowspan=4|Best Foreign Female Act
| 
| style="text-align:center;" rowspan=3|
|-
| 1999
| 
|-
| 2001
| 
|-
| 2005
| 
| style="text-align:center;" |
|-
|}

Groovevolt Music and Fashion Awards

|-
| 2005
| Uh Huh Her
| Best Rock Album – Female
|

Grammis
The Grammis Awards is the Swedish music awards. The awards are considered by many in Sweden as the Swedish equivalent of the Grammy Awards. The awards ceremony is generally held each year in February in Stockholm. The awards were established in 1969 and awarded until 1972 when they were cancelled, but subsequently revived in 1987.

|-
| 2012
| Let England Shake
| Best International Album
|

Grammy Awards
The Grammy Awards are awarded annually by the National Academy of Recording Arts and Sciences of the United States for outstanding achievements in the record industry. Often considered the highest music honor, the awards were established in 1958 and first presented in 1959. Harvey has received seven nominations.

!
|-
|rowspan="2"| 1996 
| "Down by the Water"
| Best Female Rock Vocal Performance 
| 
|rowspan="2"|
|-
| To Bring You My Love
| rowspan="2"|Best Alternative Music Album || 
|-
| 1999 
| Is This Desire?
| 
| 
|-
|rowspan="2"| 2002 
| "This is Love"
| Best Female Rock Vocal Performance 
| 
|rowspan="2"| 
|-
| Stories from the City, Stories from the Sea
| Best Rock Album 
| 
|-
| 2005 
| Uh Huh Her
|rowspan="2"| Best Alternative Music Album 
| 
| 
|-
| 2017
| The Hope Six Demolition Project
| 
|

Helpmann Awards
The Helpmann Awards recognise distinguished artistic achievement and excellence in Australia's live performing arts sectors. 

|-
| 2017
| PJ Harvey
| Best International Contemporary Concert
|

Hungarian Music Awards
The Hungarian Music Awards is the national music awards of Hungary, held every year since 1992 and promoted by Mahasz.

|-
| 2017
| The Hope Six Demolition Project
| Alternative Music Album of the Year 
|

Ivor Novello Awards
The Ivor Novello Awards are awards for songwriting and composing, presented annually by the British Academy of Songwriters, Composers and Authors (BASCA). Harvey has received one award from one nomination.

|-
| 2012 || Let England Shake || Album of the Year ||

Lunas del Auditorio
Lunas del Auditorio are sponsored by The National Auditorium in Mexico to honor the best live shows in the country. 

|-
| 2005
| Herself
| Espectaculo Alternativo 
|

MOJO Awards

MOJO Awards are awarded by the popular British music magazine, Mojo, published monthly by Bauer. Harvey received one nomination.

 
|-
| 2009
| A Woman A Man Walked By
| Best Album 
|

MTV Video Music Awards

The MTV Video Music Awards were established in the end of the summer of 1984 by MTV to celebrate the top music videos of the year.

|-
| 1995
| "Down by the Water"
| Best Female Video
|

Mercury Prize
The Mercury Prize is an annual music prize awarded for the best album from the United Kingdom and Ireland, established by the British Phonographic Industry and British Association of Record Dealers in 1992. Harvey has received two awards from four nominations and is the only artist in its history to have received the award twice.

|-
| 1993 || Rid of Me || rowspan="4" | Album of the Year || 
|-
| 1995 || To Bring You My Love || 
|-
| 2001 || Stories from the City, Stories from the Sea || 
|-
| 2011 || Let England Shake || 
|-

Meteor Music Awards
The Meteor Music Awards are the national music awards of Ireland, distributed by MCD Productions. Harvey has received one award from three nominations.

|-
| 2005 || rowspan=2|PJ Harvey || rowspan=2|Best International Female || 
|-
| rowspan=2|2008
| 
|-
| White Chalk
| Best International Album
|

NME Awards
The NME Awards is an annual music awards show in the United Kingdom, founded by the music magazine NME (New Musical Express). Harvey has received three nominations. In addition, she received the Outstanding Contribution to Music award in 2011.

|-
| 1996 || rowspan=2|PJ Harvey || rowspan=4|Best Solo Artist || 
|-
| 1997 || 
|-
| 2001 || PJ Harvey || 
|-
| 2002 || PJ Harvey ||  
|-
| 2012 || Let England Shake || Best Album || 
|-

Outstanding Contribution Award

|-
| 2011 || PJ Harvey || Outstanding Contribution to Music ||

Pollstar Concert Industry Awards
The Pollstar Concert Industry Awards aim to reward the best in the business of shows and concerts. 

|-
| 1993
| Herself
| Best New Rock Artist 
| 
|-
| 1996
| Tour (w/Live)
| Most Creative Stage Production
|

Q Awards
The Q Awards is the United Kingdom's annual music awards show, organised by the music magazine Q. Harvey has been nominated three times.
 

|-
| 2001 || Stories from the City, Stories from the Sea || Album of the Year || 
|-
| rowspan="2"| 2011 || PJ Harvey || Best Female Artist || 
|-
|| Let England Shake || Album of the Year || 
|-
| rowspan="2"| 2016 || PJ Harvey || Best Solo Artist || 
|-
|| "The Community of Hope" || Best Video || 
|-

Rober Awards Music poll

|-
| 2007
| rowspan=6|Herself
| Best Live Act
| 
|-
| rowspan=2|2008
| Best Pop Act 
| 
|-
| rowspan=2|Best Female Artist 
| 
|-
| rowspan=6|2011
| 
|-
| Best Rock Artist 
| 
|-
| Best Live Artist 
| 
|-
| Let England Shake
| Album of the Year
| 
|-
| Let England Shake: 12 Short Films by Seamus Murphy
| Best Promo Video 
| 
|-
| "The Glorious Land"
| rowspan=2|Song of the Year 
| 
|-
| rowspan=5|2016
| "The Wheel"
| 
|-
| The Hope Six Demolition Project
| Album of the Year
| 
|-
| rowspan=3|Herself
| Best Rock Artist 
| 
|-
| Best Female Artist 
| 
|-
| Best Live Artist 
| 
|-
| 2018
| "An Acre of Land" 
| Best Cover Version
|

Shortlist Music Prize
The Shortlist Music Prize is a music award given annually to an album released in the United States within the last year. PJ Harvey has received one nomination.

|-
| 2001
| Stories from the City, Stories from the Sea
| Album of the Year
|

South Bank Sky Arts Awards
The South Bank Sky Arts Awards is an arts award show, based on The South Bank Show and organised by Sky Arts. Harvey has received one award from two nominations..

|-
| 2002 || Stories from the City, Stories from the Sea || Best Pop Music Album || 
|-
| 2012 || Let England Shake || Best Pop Music Album || 
|-

UK Music Video Awards

The UK Music Video Awards is an annual award ceremony founded in 2008 to recognise creativity, technical excellence and innovation in music videos and moving images for music.

 
|-
|2016
| "The Community of Hope"
| Best Rock/Indie Video
|

Žebřík Music Awards

!Ref.
|-
| 2004
| rowspan=2|PJ Harvey
| rowspan=2|Best International Female
| 
| rowspan=2|
|-
| 2009
|

Other recognitions

See also
PJ Harvey discography

References

External links
PJ Harvey's official web site
PJ Harvey at Island Records

Harvey, PJ